The FA Cup 1987-88 is the 107th season of the world's oldest football knockout competition; The Football Association Challenge Cup, or FA Cup for short. The large number of clubs entering the tournament from lower down the English football league system meant that the competition started with a number of preliminary and qualifying rounds. The 28 victorious teams from the Fourth Round Qualifying progressed to the First Round Proper.

Preliminary round

Ties

Replays

2nd replays

3rd replay

1st qualifying round

Ties

Replays

2nd replays

2nd qualifying round

Ties

Replays

2nd replays

3rd qualifying round

Ties

Replays

4th qualifying round
The teams that given byes to this round are Lincoln City, Maidstone United, Enfield, Boston United, Runcorn, Bath City, Dagenham, Wealdstone, Nuneaton Borough, Frickley Athletic, Dartford, Bishop's Stortford, Bognor Regis Town, Farnborough Town, Whitby Town, Chelmsford City, Slough Town, V S Rugby, Caernarfon Town and Chorley.

Ties

Replays

1987-88 FA Cup
See 1987-88 FA Cup for details of the rounds from the First Round Proper onwards.

External links
Football Club History Database: FA Cup 1987-88
FA Cup Past Results

Qual
FA Cup qualifying rounds